Elizabeth Diller, also known as Liz Diller, is an American architect and partner in Diller Scofidio + Renfro, which she co-founded in 1979. She is also an architecture professor at Princeton University.

Life
Elizabeth Diller was born in 1954 in Łódź, Poland, to Jewish parents. The family emigrated to the United States in 1960 when she was six years old.

Diller earned her B.Arch in 1979 from the Cooper Union School of Architecture. She met Ricardo Scofidio during her studies; he was her teacher then her tutor. After earning her degree, they later married in the 1980s. Since the 2000s, she has become well-known for her work with conceptual architecture, museums and other cultural institutions.

Awards and honors 
Diller is considered among the most influential designers of cultural spaces and in 1999 received the first MacArthur Foundation fellowship in architecture. In 2002, Diller designed the Blur Building for the Swiss Expo with this money.

In 2000 she was awarded the James Beard Award for Outstanding Restaurant Design.

The studio that Diller co-founded was awarded WSJ. magazine's 2017 Architecture Innovator of the Year Award. It also received the Smithsonian Institution National Design Award.

In 2018 she was named to the Time magazine most-influential list for the second time, and was the only architect on that list.

In 2019, Diller became the winner of the Jane Drew Prize, and the eighth winner of the annual Women in Architecture award.

In 2022 she was awarded the Wolf Prize in Arts in the category "Architecture".

Works 
 According to Architectural Digest, Elizabeth Diller and Ricardo Scofidio, since 2002, have created many projects including the Blur in Switzerland; the Institute of Contemporary Art, Boston; the High Line on the west side of Manhattan; a series of renovations to Lincoln Center; a film museum in Berkeley, California; buildings at Brown University and Stanford University; and the Broad Museum in Los Angeles.
 They have been continuously working on several projects: Vagelos Center at Columbia Medical School; a new business-school building for Columbia University; the London Centre for Music at the Barbican; and a cinema museum in Rio de Janeiro.
She has written books including: Lincoln Center Inside Out: An Architectural Account in 2012, and has been interviewed in other works such as Bodybuilding: Architecture and Performance in 2019.

Further reading
 "Architecture Is a Technology That Has Not Yet Discovered Its Agency", by Elizabeth Diller and Anthony Vidler addresses the underlying reliance modern architects have on technology and the effects of this technology on architecture itself. In this work she explains the problems associated with technology and its use in architecture, yet also defines architecture as a certain type of technology that applies various systems in the world as a whole.
 "Elizabeth Diller and Ricardo Scofidio: 'The city is a public resource was written by London architect and designer Edwin Heathcote in May 2019. Heathcote interviewed Diller and Scofidio about some of their larger works, projects before they became known in the architectural sphere, and explains their experimental process when designing buildings-specifically in New York City and Manhattan.

References

 Dimendberg, Edward, "Elizabeth Diller". Architectural Review Volume, no. 1459 (Mar 2019): p. 98-101.
 Gilmartin, Benjamin et al., "Democratizing Space". A+U: Architecture and Urbanism Volume, no. 6 (June 2019): p. 7-17.
 Kim, Narae, and Elizabeth Diller, "Dreamer, Doer, Creator". Space Volume, no. 596 (July 2017): p 28-33.

1954 births
American Jews
American people of Polish-Jewish descent
Living people
Architects from New York City
MacArthur Fellows
Princeton University faculty
American women architects
Polish emigrants to the United States
Polish Jews
Cooper Union alumni
Members of the American Academy of Arts and Letters